Dino Stančič (born 25 January 1992) is a Slovenian footballer who plays as a forward for FK Csíkszereda. He also played for Koper, Jadran Dekani, Krka, Tabor Sežana, and Kras Repen.

References

External links

1992 births
Living people
People from Sežana
Slovenian footballers
Association football forwards
FC Koper players
NK Krka players
NK Tabor Sežana players
FK Csíkszereda Miercurea Ciuc players
Slovenian PrvaLiga players
Slovenian Second League players
Liga II players
Slovenian expatriate footballers
Slovenian expatriate sportspeople in Italy
Expatriate footballers in Italy
Slovenian expatriate sportspeople in Romania
Expatriate footballers in Romania
Slovenia youth international footballers